California is a borough on the Monongahela River in Washington County, Pennsylvania, United States, and part of the Pittsburgh metropolitan area since 1950. The population was 5,479 as of the 2020 census and was estimated at 5,453 in 2021. California is the home of PennWest California a part of Pennsylvania Western University (formerly known as California University of Pennsylvania before July 2022).  Founded in 1849, the borough was named for the territory of California following the Gold Rush. The borough has had two notably young mayors—Democrat Peter Daley, who was 22 at his election, and Republican Casey Durdines, who was 20 at his election.

Geography
California is located at  (40.065313, -79.897120).

Surrounding and adjacent neighborhoods
California has seven land borders, including Fallowfield Township to the north, Long Branch and Elco to the northeast, Coal Center to the mideast, West Brownsville to the southeast, Centerville from the south to the west-southwest, and West Pike Run Township to the west.  Across the Monongahela River in Fayette County, California runs adjacent with Newell and Jefferson Township.

History
When founded in 1849, the town was named California, though Columbia and Sagamore were names that were also suggested for the new town. The town’s founding coincided with the California Gold Rush and the town was named after the state to symbolize growth and prosperity.  Naming the town after the state was meant . Before there were mayors in California, there were burgesses, the first of whom was Solomon Sibbitt.

East Pike Run Township merged with California Borough in 1953.
The former Vigilant Mine in California once produced the largest single lump of coal in the world.
California was once home to the largest soft coal mine in the world when Vesta # 4 opened in 1893.
The unincorporated town of Philipsburg used to sit on land that is now occupied by Pennsylvania Western University or PennWest (formerly known as California University of Pennsylvania before July 2022). This includes the Philipsburg Cemetery, which is still in use and includes a number of graves of Civil War soldiers.
The first house built in California is next to the California Post Office on Second Street.

The Molly Fleming House, Jennings-Gallagher House, Malden Inn, Old Main, California State College and former Pennsylvania Railroad Passenger Station are listed on the National Register of Historic Places.  The California Boatyards played an important role in building steamboats for western expansion.

Demographics

As of the census of 2000, there were 5,274 people, 1,891 households, and 867 families residing in the borough. The population density was 478.2 people per square mile (184.6/km2). There were 2,092 housing units at an average density of 189.7 per square mile (73.2/km2). The racial makeup of the borough was 93.93% White, 4.13% African American, 0.17% Native American, 0.74% Asian, 0.13% from other races, and 0.89% from two or more races. Hispanic or Latino of any race were 0.49% of the population.

There were 1,891 households, out of which 16.4% had children under the age of 18 living with them, 34.8% were married couples living together, 8.0% had a female householder with no husband present, and 54.1% were non-families. 36.6% of all households were made up of individuals, and 16.2% had someone living alone who was 65 years of age or older. The average household size was 2.15 and the average family size was 2.85.

In the borough the population was spread out, with 10.7% under the age of 18, 42.2% from 18 to 24, 17.3% from 25 to 44, 15.5% from 45 to 64, and 14.3% who were 65 years of age or older. The median age was 24 years. For every 100 females, there were 92.8 males. For every 100 females age 18 and over, there were 91.3 males.

The median income for a household in the borough was $24,628, and the median income for a family was $43,168. Males had a median income of $35,833 versus $24,537 for females. The per capita income for the borough was $14,412. About 7.3% of families and 22.3% of the population were below the poverty line, including 14.7% of those under age 18 and 8.1% of those age 65 or over.

Education
California Area School District
Pennsylvania Western University or PennWest (formerly known as California University of Pennsylvania prior to July 2022 and earlier as California State College of Pennsylvania)

Notable people
Viola Liuzzo, a Unitarian Universalist and civil rights activist murdered in the events of Bloody Sunday, in Selma, Alabama, on March 7, 1965. She was born in California.
Joseph A. "Jock" Yablonski, an American labor leader in the United Mine Workers in the 1950s and 1960s. He was murdered in 1969 by killers hired by a union political opponent. Longtime resident of California.
Bruce Dal Canton, a major league pitcher for the Pittsburgh Pirates, Kansas City Royals, Atlanta Braves and Chicago White Sox. Born in California.
Bert Humphries, a major league pitcher for the Philadelphia Phillies, Cincinnati Reds and Chicago Cubs in the early 20th century. Born in California.
Don LeJohn, a Major League Baseball third baseman and Minor League Baseball manager. LeJohn was signed by the Brooklyn Dodgers in 1954 and played in the minor leagues through 1971 with various Dodgers affiliates. Resident of California.

References

External links
 

 
Boroughs in Washington County, Pennsylvania
Pennsylvania populated places on the Monongahela River
Pittsburgh metropolitan area
Populated places established in 1849
1849 establishments in Pennsylvania